Robert Edward Hoysted  (8 June 1925 – 9 May 2014) was an Australian racehorse trainer, best known for training the renowned sprinter Manikato.

Hoysted was a member of an Australian racing dynasty, with his father Fred "Father" Hoysted and brother Bon Hoysted also trainers.  Bob and Bon assisted Father, who was seriously ill, with preparation of 1954 Melbourne Cup-winner Rising Fast.  Bob acquired his own trainers licence in 1956.

As well as Manikato, Hoysted also trained Rose of Kingston and Sydeston. Hoysted was a "driving force" behind the Australian Trainers Association (ATA), serving as federal president for over quarter of a century.

He was appointed a Member of the Order of Australia in 1993 for "service to racehorse training and to the industrial welfare of trainers" and was inducted into the Australian Racing Hall of Fame in 2008.  After retiring as a trainer, Hoysted retired to the regional Victorian city of Castlemaine.

During World War II, Hoysted served in the Royal Australian Navy and was present on HMAS Warramunga in Tokyo Bay during the signing of the Japanese Instrument of Surrender on 2 September 1945.

References

External links
Australian Racing Hall of Fame - Bob Hoysted

1925 births
2014 deaths
Members of the Order of Australia
Horse trainers from Melbourne
Royal Australian Navy personnel of World War II